Young Communist League of Western Ukraine (KZMZU) was the youth league of the Communist Party of Western Ukraine.

Membership of KZMZU

References

Youth wings of political parties in Poland
Youth wings of communist parties